Joe Fraser (born 6 December 1998) is an English artistic gymnast.  He is the 2022 European all-around and  parallel bars champion and the 2019 world champion on the parallel bars, the first British gymnast to ever win gold in any of these events. As a member of the British Senior team since 2017, he has also won team gold and silver, and bronze on the pommel horse, in the European Artistic Gymnastic Championships. Representing England in the 2022 Commonwealth Games, Fraser won three gold medals in team, pommel horse and parallel bars.

Personal life
Fraser was born 6 December 1998 with six fingers on each hand; he had the additional digits removed as a baby.

At age five, Fraser enjoyed doing flips at home; his mother, concerned about injury, sent him to a gymnastics centre to learn how to do the skills properly.

When he retires, Fraser intends to become a gymnastics coach.

Career

2017 
Fraser made his international senior debut in June at the 2017 European Championships in Cluj-Napoca, Romania.

In July, he won the All-Around title at the 2017 British Championships. He also won a gold medal on the high bar, silver medal on rings and bronze medal on parallel bars.

Fraser also competed at the World Championships in Quebec, Canada.

2018 
Early in the year, Fraser fell from the high bar and damaged ligaments in his ankles, making him unable to compete in the 2018 Commonwealth Games in Gold Coast, QLD, Australia. He returned to international competition at the 2018 World Challenge Cup in Guimares, Portugal.

At the 2018 European Championships in Glasgow, Fraser won a silver as part of the team.

Fraser also competed at the World Championships in Doha, Qatar.

2019 
In March 2019, Fraser won a silver medal on the high bar and bronze medal on parallel bars at the British Championships. At the 2019 European Championships in Szczecin, Poland, Fraser narrowly missed out on a bronze medal by 0.033 marks in the all-around final.

In October, Fraser won gold at the Gymnastics World Championships in Stuttgart, Germany for his performance on the parallel bars with a score 15.000. He was the youngest competitor on the apparatus and his win was Great Britain's first gold medal on the apparatus.

2021 
At the 2020 Summer Olympics in Tokyo, Japan, Fraser competed for Great Britain. The team, consisting of Max Whitlock, James Hall, Giarnni Regini-Moran and Fraser, took fourth place with a score of 255.76. Fraser then continued to compete in the Olympics at Tokyo and qualified for the individual all round final where he came 9th in his debut games.

2022 
At the British Championships Fraser won the all-around title.  Fraser next competed at the Baku World Cup. He advanced to the parallel bars and horizontal bar finals and was a reserve athlete for pommel horse.  During the parallel bars final he won bronze medal behind Illia Kovtun from Ukraine and Ferhat Arican from Turkey. The next day he won gold on the horizontal bar.

Despite being hampered by an ankle injury sustained only two weeks before the Commonwealth Games, Fraser was able to compete on four apparatus and contribute to the England team's successful defence of their Commonwealth title. Fraser also went on to take gold in both the pommel horse and parallel bars. In the former, he beat  2018 champion Rhys McClenaghan while in the latter, he beat compatriot Giarnni Regini-Moran.

Fraser won the all-around at the European Championships ahead of Adem Asil and Ahmet Önder. Additionally, he qualified to the pommel horse and parallel bars finals, and helped Great Britain qualify to the team final.

References

External links 
 Joe Fraser at British Gymnastics
 

 
 
 

1998 births
Living people
British male artistic gymnasts
Sportspeople from Birmingham, West Midlands
Black British sportsmen
World champion gymnasts
Gymnasts at the 2020 Summer Olympics
Olympic gymnasts of Great Britain
Commonwealth Games gold medallists for England
Gymnasts at the 2022 Commonwealth Games
Commonwealth Games medallists in gymnastics
European champions in gymnastics
Medallists at the 2022 Commonwealth Games